Ronald Wayne Homenuke (born January 5, 1952) is a Canadian former NHL player. He played in only one NHL game for the Vancouver Canucks, who had drafted him with the 51st pick in the 1972 Draft. He retired in 1976.

Homenuke now works as a missionary with street kids in the Philippines.

Career statistics

See also
List of players who played only one game in the NHL

References

External links

1952 births
Albuquerque Six-Guns players
Calgary Centennials players
Canadian ice hockey forwards
Ice hockey people from British Columbia
Living people
Seattle Totems (CHL) players
Seattle Totems (WHL) players
Vancouver Canucks draft picks
Vancouver Canucks players
Canadian expatriates in the Philippines